Sonalium railway station is a small railway station in South Goa district, Goa. Its code is LIM. It serves Sonalium village. The station consists of a single platform. The platform is not well sheltered. It lacks many facilities including water and sanitation. This station is one of three in Braganza Ghats.

References

Hubli railway division
Railway stations in South Goa district